Just Another Day is a BBC documentary series, shown over twenty thirty minute episodes. The series follows John Pitman behind the scenes of places that are considered part of the British way of life.

Episodes

Series 1

Series 2

Series 3

References

External links

Just Another Day at BBC Genome episode list

1980s British drama television series
1983 British television series debuts
1986 British television series endings
BBC television documentaries
BBC Television shows
English-language television shows
Television shows set in the United Kingdom